Abies delavayi subsp. fansipanensis, also known as the Fansipan fir, is a subspecies of fir tree in the family Pinaceae. It is native to Vietnam.

Status
It is listed as critically endangered by the IUCN.

References

delavayi subsp. fansipanensis
Flora of Vietnam